Kalol is one of the 182 Legislative Assembly constituencies of Gujarat state in India. It is part of Gandhinagar district and is numbered as 38-Kalol. It is a part of the Gandhinagar Lok Sabha constituency.

List of segments
This assembly seat represents the following segments:

Kalol Taluka (part) villages – Bhavpura, Kantha, Nava, Golthara, Nardipur, Mokhasan, Dingucha, Pansar, Bhadol, Dhamasna, Isand, Vadavsvami, Bileshvarpura, Dhanot, Chhatral, Ola, Arsodiya, Pratappura, Piyaj, Borisana, Dhanaj, Palsana, Sherisa, Ramnagar, Vansajada, Bhoyan Moti, Sabaspur, Usmanabad, Ganpatpura, Jaspur, Dantali, Vadsar, Karoli, Hajipur, Bhimasan, Jethlaj, Khatraj, Sanavad, Santej, Rakanpur, Ranchhodpura, Nasmed, Adhana, Mulasana, Vayana, Vansajada Dhedia, Unali, Rancharada, Nandoli, Palodiya, Chhatral (INA), Kalol (INA), Saij, Kalol (M).

Members of Legislative Assembly

Election results

2022

2017

2012

See also
 List of constituencies of the Gujarat Legislative Assembly
 Gandhinagar district
 Gujarat Legislative Assembly

References

External links
 

Assembly constituencies of Gujarat
Gandhinagar district